The Thumper is the debut album by saxophonist Jimmy Heath featuring performances recorded in 1959 originally released on the Riverside label.

Reception

Scott Yanow of Allmusic says, "The excellent session of late '50s straightahead jazz is uplifted above the normal level by Heath's writing".

Track listing
All compositions by Jimmy Heath except as indicated
 "For Minors Only" - 4:53    
 "Who Needs It?" (Wynton Kelly) - 5:35    
 "Don't You Know I Care (Or Don't You Care to Know)" (Mack David, Duke Ellington) - 5:02    
 "Two Tees" - 4:14    
 "The Thumper" - 4:01    
 "New Keep" - 4:11    
 "For All We Know" (J. Fred Coots, Sam M. Lewis) - 4:35    
 "I Can Make You Love Me" (Peter DeRose, Bob Russell) - 3:27    
 "Nice People" - 3:52

Personnel
Jimmy Heath - tenor saxophone
Nat Adderley - cornet
Curtis Fuller - trombone
Wynton Kelly - piano
Paul Chambers - bass
Albert Heath - drums

References

Riverside Records albums
Jimmy Heath albums
1960 albums